Sister Islands are a group of uninhabited islands of the Andaman Islands. They belong to the South Andaman administrative district, part of the Indian union territory of Andaman and Nicobar Islands.

History
Before the British established a colony on the Andaman, the Sister islands were visited occasionally by the Onge people of Little Andaman Island for fishing.  They may have been a waystation for their temporary settlement of Rutland Island between 1890 and 1930.

The islands have been a wildlife refuge since 1987, with 0.36 km2.

Geography
The islands belong to the Rutland Archipelago and are located south of Passage Island (Andaman).
The islands are located at the northern side of the Duncan Passage, about 6 km southeast of Passage Island and 18 km north of North Brother.
The group consists of: 
 East Sister Island (Andaman)
 West Sister Island (Andaman)

The islands are 220 m apart, connected by a coral reef. They are covered by forests and have rocky shores except for a beach on the NW side of East Sister. East Sister Island is 76m high and West Sister Island is 70.7m high.

Administration
Politically, Sister Islands are part of Port Blair Taluk.

References 

Islands of the Andaman and Nicobar Islands
Archipelagoes of the Andaman and Nicobar Islands
Uninhabited islands of India